Roselawn Avenue Cemetery is a cemetery located in Forest Hill, Toronto.

Opened in 1906 by Samuel Weber, Roselawn is one of several Jewish cemeteries in Toronto, and was established to serve the Jewish community outside of the downtown area. The cemetery runs along Roselawn Avenue, and is surrounded by homes that were built around it.

The cemetery is associated with Steeles Memorial Chapel.

Notable burials
 Morley Safer (1931–2016), Toronto born US journalist and co-host of 60 Minutes.

References

External links
 

Jewish cemeteries in Toronto
1906 establishments in Ontario